Anapisa connexa is a moth of the family Erebidae. It was described by Francis Walker in 1854. It is found on Bioko, 32 km off the west coast of Africa.

References

Moths described in 1854
Syntomini
Moths of Africa